Alla Shulimovna Kushnir  (11 August 1941 – 2 August 2013) was a Soviet-born Israeli chess player. She was awarded the FIDE titles of Woman International Master (WIM) in 1962 and Woman Grandmaster (WGM) in 1976. In 2017, she was inducted into the World Chess Hall of Fame.

Biography
Alla Kushnir immigrated from the Soviet Union to Israel in 1974.

Chess career
Kushnir was thrice Women's World Chess Championship Challenger consecutively. She lost matches for the title to Nona Gaprindashvili:
 +3 –7 =3 at Riga 1965;
 +2 –6 =5 at Tbilisi–Moscow 1969;
 +4 –5 =7 at Riga 1972.

In tournaments, she took 1st-3rd at Sukhumi Candidates Tournament (joint Milunka Lazarević and Tatiana Zatulovskaya) 1964, won at Beberjik 1967, won at Subotica (Candidates Tournament) 1967, 2nd at Belgrad 1968, tied for 1st-2nd (with Nikolau) at Sinaia 1969, tied for 2nd-3rd (with Vobralova, won by Ivánka) at Wijk aan Zee 1971, won at Belgrad 1971 (ahead Gaprindashvili), won at Moscow 1971, won at Vrnjačka Banja 1973, 3rd at Voronezh 1973 (behind Zatulovskaya and Saunina), won at Roosendaal Interzonal 1976 (joint Akhmilovskaya).

Kushnir was a three-time winner of the Women's Chess Olympiad: in 1969 and 1972 she won the tournament as a player in the Soviet team, both times showing the best result at the 2nd board, and in 1976 she won it as a player in the Israeli team, showing the best result at the 1st board.

She ended 5th USSR Women's Champion in Lipetsk (1959), 3rd-4th with Volpert USSR Women's Champion in Baku (1961), 2nd-3rd with Volpert USSR Women's Champion in Riga (1962), 3rd-4th with Koslovskaya USSR Women's Champion in Baku (1963) (then in the match playoff Kushnir beat Koslovskaya: 4–2), tied 1st place with Ranniku USSR Women's Champion in Beltsy (1970). Kushnir in the match playoff to beat 4-3 Ranniku at Moscow (February 1971).

Death
She died in 2013 in Tel Aviv, nine days before her 72nd birthday, from undisclosed causes.

See also
Sports in Israel
List of Jewish chess players

References

External links
 
 Jews in Sports bio
 Obituary (WhyChess.com), with special photograph

1941 births
2013 deaths
Chess woman grandmasters
Israeli female chess players
Soviet female chess players
Jewish chess players
Chess Olympiad competitors
Israeli Jews
Russian Jews
Soviet emigrants to Israel
Sportspeople from Moscow